Barry Aguibou (born 13 August 1950) is a Guinean boxer. He competed in the 1980 Summer Olympics.

1980 Olympic results
Below is the record of Barry Aguibo, a Guinean flyweight boxer who competed at the 1980 Moscow Olympics:

 Round of 32: lost to Hassan Sherif (Ethiopia) by disqualification

References

1950 births
Living people
Boxers at the 1980 Summer Olympics
Guinean male boxers
Olympic boxers of Guinea
Flyweight boxers